Dark Passage is a Turkish professional esports organization with players competing in League of Legends, Fortnite Battle Royale, Hearthstone, and PlayerUnknown's Battlegrounds. It is the oldest esports organization in Turkey, having been originally established in 2003 as a Counter-Strike team.

Dark Passage's League of Legends team competes in the Turkish Championship League (TCL), the top level of professional League of Legends in Turkey. In 2014 the team qualified for that year's World Championship after winning IWCT Gamescom 2014.

League of Legends 

From 2013 to 2014, Dark Passage dominated the competitive League of Legends scene in Turkey. The team won all three seasons of the Riot Games Turkey Tournament in 2013, as well as that year's championship tournament. They also won all three seasons of the Turkish Championship League (TCL) in 2014. After winning the 2014 Riot Games Turkish Championship, Dark Passage qualified for the International Wild Card Tournament (IWCT), where they defeated Australian team Legacy Esports 3–0 to qualify for the 2014 World Championship.

For the 2014 World Championship group stage, Dark Passage was placed in Group A, along with Korean team Samsung Galaxy White, Chinese team Edward Gaming, and Taiwanese team ahq e-Sports Club. The team finished last in Group A and 14th–16th overall, failing to win a single game and ending with a 0–6 record.

Rosters

League of Legends

Fortnite Battle Royale

PlayerUnknown's Battlegrounds 
  Antodalt
  Apocalyp
  schzA
  Wreckage35

References

External links 
 

2003 establishments in Turkey
Esports teams based in Turkey
Hearthstone teams
PlayerUnknown's Battlegrounds teams
Turkish Championship League teams